Corral De Mulas Airport  is an airport serving the village of Corral De Mulas in Usulután Department, El Salvador. The unmarked grass runway is west of and adjacent to the village.

See also

Transport in El Salvador
List of airports in El Salvador

References

External links
 OpenStreetMap - Corral De Mulas
 HERE/Nokia - Corral De Mulas
 FallingRain - Corral De Mulas

Airports in El Salvador